Platt may have been an unincorporated community in DeSoto County, Florida, United States, located approximately  west of Fort Ogden.

Geography

References

Unincorporated communities in DeSoto County, Florida
Unincorporated communities in Florida